James Donald Walker (11 July 1873 – 2 June 1932) was an Australian rules footballer who played with St Kilda in the Victorian Football League (VFL).

References

External links 

1873 births
1932 deaths
Australian rules footballers from Victoria (Australia)
St Kilda Football Club players